Jack van Bekhoven (born 23 October 1959) is a Dutch sports shooter. He competed at the 1988 Summer Olympics and the 1992 Summer Olympics.

References

External links
 

1959 births
Living people
Dutch male sport shooters
Olympic shooters of the Netherlands
Shooters at the 1988 Summer Olympics
Shooters at the 1992 Summer Olympics
Sportspeople from North Brabant